Tibor Melichárek (21 November 1976) is a Slovak professional ice hockey player.

He played with clubs including HC Slovan Bratislava in the Slovak Extraliga.

Career statistics

References

1976 births
Living people
HC Oceláři Třinec players
HC Slovan Bratislava players
HC Sparta Praha players
HK Dubnica players
HK Dukla Trenčín players
Motor České Budějovice players
ŠHK 37 Piešťany players
Slovak ice hockey forwards
Sportspeople from Topoľčany
Slovak expatriate ice hockey players in the Czech Republic